Chen was a state founded by the Duke Hu of Chen during the Zhou dynasty of ancient China. It existed from c. 1045 BC–479 BC. Its capital was Wanqiu, in present-day Huaiyang County in the plains of eastern Henan province. Chen, the 4th most popular surname in the world, and members of the Hu clan would claim descent from the Duke Hu of Chen who was in turn descended from the legendary Emperor Shun. At its peak, Chen encompassed fourteen cities in modern-day Henan and Anhui.

Name 
It is written 陳 the same as the Chen surname. In ancient texts, it is sometimes misspelled as 敶, also pronounced Chen.

Territory 
Chen was originally from Taihao (太昊、太皞), the capital of Fuxi's clan. It was south of the Yellow River.

Capital 

Its capital was Wanqiu, in present-day Huaiyang County in the plains of eastern Henan province. Zhu Xi explains that Wanqiu means "[a hill] with a crater on top surrounded by high walls on all four sides".

Wanqiu features prominently in an eponymous aria in Shijing (《詩經·國風》《陳風·宛丘》) :

History 

According to tradition, the royal family of Chen were descendants of the legendary sage king Emperor Shun. After the conquest of the Shang dynasty in 1046/45 BC, King Wu of Zhou enfeoffed his son-in-law Gui Man, a descendant of Shun, at Chen, and Man became known as Duke Hu of Chen (Chen Hugong).

Duke Shēn of Chen, son of Hugong then became second duke of Chen.

Chen later became an ally state of Chu, fighting as an ally of Chu at the Battle of Chengpu. It was finally unified with the Chu in 479 BC. Many people of Chen then took the name of their former country as their family name, and account for the many of Chinese people with the family name Chen today. After the destruction of the old Chu capital at Ying, Chen became the Chu capital.

Achievements and descendants 

 The founding duke, Chen Hugong, is credited with being the originator of the Chen (surname), now the fourth most popular surname in the world
 The Chen clan would later found the Chen Dynasty of China and then the Trần dynasty, a golden age of Vietnam (陳朝 Tran is the Vietnamese pronunciation of Chen).
 In 1400 AD, Hồ Quý Ly overthrew the Trần dynasty and established the Hồ dynasty (Hồ is the Vietnamese pronunciation for "Hu"). He claimed to be a descendant of Chen Hugong and Emperor Shun, and changed the name of Vietnam from Đại Việt to Đại Ngu (大虞), or Great Ngu (Ngu is the Vietnamese pronunciation for Yu 虞 the legendary state of Emperor Shun).
 In ancient times 陳 sounded similar to 東 dong, meaning 'East'. It also sounded similar to 田 tian. After the warring states period, some members of the Chen clan in Qi (state) adopted the surname 田 Tian, which later became popular in Chinese and Japanese surnames. 
In summary, surnames with descent from Chen include: 

 Chen surname 陳姓
 Gui surname 妫姓
 Hu surname 胡姓
 Tian surname 田姓
 Yu surname 虞姓
 Yao surname 姚姓
 Yuan surname 袁姓

Culture 
The Shijing has at least 10 songs dedicated to Chen:《宛丘》、《東門之枌》、《衛門》、《東門之池》、《東門之楊》、《墓門》、《防有鵲巢》、《月出》、《株林》、《澤陂》。

Rulers 
The Chen state lasted nearly 600 years and produced over 25 rulers. In chronological order from first to last (note Hu Gong means Duke of Hu and vice versa):
 Duke Hu of Chen
Duke Shēn of Chen 
Duke Xiang of Chen
Duke Xiao of Chen
Duke Shèn of Chen
 Duke You of Chen
 Duke Xi of Chen
 Duke Wu of Chen
 Duke Yi of Chen
 Duke Ping of Chen
 Duke Wen of Chen
 Duke Huan of Chen
 Chen Tuo
 Duke Li of Chen
 Duke Zhuang of Chen
 Duke Xuan of Chen
 Duke Mu of Chen
 Duke Gong of Chen
 Duke Ling of Chen
 Xia Zhengshu
 Duke Cheng of Chen
 Duke Ai of Chen
 Prince Liu
 Chuan Fengxu
 Duke Hui of Chen
 Duke Huai of Chen
 Duke Min of Chen

Table 

註1：陳幽公以前的君主在位年，皆為推測所得，僅供參考。

Family tree 

See :zh:陈国君主世系图

See also
 Chen (surname), 陳姓 adopted by people of Chen state
 Chen Hugong, founding emperor

 Emperor Shun (舜帝), forefather of Chen
 Tian Qi 田齊
 Gui surname 妫姓
 Hu surname 胡姓
 Tian surname 田姓
 Yu surname 虞姓
 Yao surname 姚姓
 Yuan surname 袁姓

Yuan Taotu, relative of Chen family

References

Bibliography

Reading 

 《史記》卷36：陳杞世家 [Shiji]
 《春秋左氏傳》(始見於隱公三年) [Spring and Autumn period]

 
Ancient Chinese states
Zhou dynasty
11th century BC
11th-century BC establishments in China
States and territories established in the 11th century BC
5th-century BC disestablishments in China
States and territories disestablished in the 5th century BC